Salcedia is a genus of beetles in the family Carabidae, containing the following species:

 Salcedia africana (Britton, 1947)
Salcedia baroensis Balkenohl, 2020
 Salcedia coquilhati Alluaud, 1932
 Salcedia elongata Alluaud, 1932
Salcedia faillei Balkenohl, 2020
Salcedia lukulua Balkenohl, 2020
 Salcedia matsumotoi Balkenohl, 2020
Salcedia miranda (Andrewes, 1920)
 Salcedia nigeriensis Alluaud, 1930
 Salcedia parallela Baehr, 1998
 Salcedia perrieri Fairmaire, 1899
Salcedia procera Balkenohl, 2020
 Salcedia putzeysi (R. Oberthür, 1883)
 Salcedia robusta Balkenohl, 2020
Salcedia schoutedeni Alluaud, 1930
 Salcedia tuberculata Balkenohl, 2020
Salcedia unifoveata Balkenohl, 2020
Salcedia utetea Balkenohl, 2020

References

Scaritinae